Tomistoma cairense is an extinct species of gavialoid crocodilian from the Lutetian stage of the Eocene era. It lived in North East Africa, especially Egypt. Remains of T. cairense have been found in the Mokattam Formation, in Mokattam, Egypt. Tomistoma cairense did not have a Maxilla process within their lacrimal gland, whereas all extant (living) crocodilians do.

Below is a cladogram based morphological studies comparing skeletal features that shows Tomistoma cairense as a member of Tomistominae, related to the false gharial:

Based on morphological studies of extinct taxa, the tomistomines (including the living false gharial) were long thought to be classified as crocodiles and not closely related to gavialoids. However, recent molecular studies using DNA sequencing have consistently indicated that the false gharial (Tomistoma) (and by inference other related extinct forms in Tomistominae) actually belong to Gavialoidea (and Gavialidae).

Below is a cladogram from a 2018 tip dating study by Lee & Yates simultaneously using morphological, molecular (DNA sequencing), and stratigraphic (fossil age) data that shows Tomistoma cairense as a gavialoid, more basal than the last common ancestor to both the gharial and the false gharial:

Tomistoma cairense may need to be reclassified to a new genera, as studies have shown that its inclusion makes Tomistoma out to be paraphyletic.

References

Gavialidae
Lutetian first appearances
Lutetian extinctions